Banbhag is an Indian Village in Purnia District of Bihar state.

References

 India
Geography of Bihar